The cuneiform bi sign, also pí, and used for other syllabic forms, as well as a sumerogram, is a common use syllabic and alphabetic cuneiform sign used in both the mid-14th century BC Amarna letters and the Epic of Gilgamesh. In the Amarna letters, it is sometimes used for the spelling of the archers (Egyptian pitati), 'pí-t(x)-t(x)', an often requested need from the Pharaoh in the vassal state sub-corpus of the letters.

As a sumerogram, (capital letter (majuscule)), sign bi is used for KAŠ, Akkadian language for "šikāru", beer.

The following linguistic elements for bi are used in the Epic:

bé
bi
gaš
kaš
pí
KAŠ, sumerogram: "beer"

The bi sign's usage numbers in the Epic of Gilgamesh are as follows: bé-(25 times), bi-(190), gaš-(1), kaš-(12), pí-(2), KAŠ-(1).

Amarna letters usage

Use of pí, Egyptian archers
The archers were part of the Egyptian army, and often requested by the Canaanite vassal city-states, when writing to the Pharaoh in the Amarna letters. They were named the pitati, Akkadian language "piṭātu", "troops of soldiers", and spelled in a variety of ways, often starting with the bi sign as pí.

A partial listing of spellings of "ERIM.MEŠ-pitati", by Amarna letter:

EA 86, 86:7--pí-ṭa-ti
EA 282, 282:11--pí-ṭa-ti
EA 290, 290:20--pí-ṭa-ti
EA 296, 296:34--pí-ṭa-ti

References

Moran, William L. 1987, 1992. The Amarna Letters. Johns Hopkins University Press, 1987, 1992. 393 pages.(softcover)
 Parpola, 1971. The Standard Babylonian Epic of Gilgamesh, Parpola, Simo, Neo-Assyrian Text Corpus Project, c 1997, Tablet I thru Tablet XII, Index of Names, Sign List, and Glossary-(pp. 119–145), 165 pages.
Rainey, 1970. El Amarna Tablets, 359-379, Anson F. Rainey, (AOAT 8, Alter Orient Altes Testament 8, Kevelaer and Neukirchen -Vluyen), 1970, 107 pages.

Cuneiform signs